The Grove is a village in County Durham, in England. It is situated to the south of Consett.

Villages in County Durham